Skin care is a range of practices that support skin integrity, enhance its appearance, and relieve skin conditions. They can include nutrition, avoidance of excessive sun exposure, and appropriate use of emollients. Practices that enhance appearance include the use of cosmetics, botulinum, exfoliation, fillers, laser resurfacing, microdermabrasion, peels, retinol therapy, and ultrasonic skin treatment. Skin care is a routine daily procedure in many settings, such as skin that is either too dry or too moist, and prevention of dermatitis and prevention of skin injuries.

Skin care is a part of the treatment of wound healing, radiation therapy and some medications.

Background

Skin care is at the interface of cosmetics and dermatology.

The US Federal Food, Drug, and Cosmetic Act defines cosmetics as products intended to cleanse or beautify (for instance, shampoos and lipstick). A separate category exists for medications, which are intended to diagnose, cure, mitigate, treat, or prevent disease, or to affect the structure or function of the body (for instance, sunscreens and acne creams), although some products, such as moisturizing sunscreens and anti-dandruff shampoos, are regulated within both categories.

Skin care differs from dermatology by its inclusion of non-physician professionals, such as estheticians and wound care nursing staff. Skin care includes modifications of individual behavior and of environmental and working conditions.

Neonate

Guidelines for neonatal skin care have been developed. Nevertheless, the pediatric and dermatological communities have not reached a consensus on best cleansing practices, as good quality scientific evidence is scarce. Immersion in water seems superior to washing alone, and use of synthetic detergents or mild liquid baby cleansers seems comparable or superior to water alone. Add from

Sunscreen

Sun protection is an important aspect of skin care. Though the sun is beneficial in order for the human body to get its daily dose of vitamin D, unprotected excessive sunlight can cause extreme damage to the skin. Ultraviolet (UVA and UVB) radiation in the sun's rays can cause sunburn in varying degrees, early ageing and an increased risk of skin cancer. UV exposure can cause patches of uneven skin tone and dry out the skin. It can even reduce skin's elasticity and encourage sagging and wrinkle formation.

Sunscreen can protect the skin from sun damage; sunscreen should be applied at least 20 minutes before exposure and should be re-applied every four hours. Sunscreen should be applied to all areas of the skin that will be exposed to sunlight, and at least a tablespoon (25 ml) should be applied to each limb, the face, chest, and back, to ensure thorough coverage. Many tinted moisturizers, foundations and primers now contain some form of SPF.

Sunscreens may come in the form of creams, gels or lotions; their SPF number indicates their effectiveness in protecting the skin from the sun's radiation. There are sunscreens available to suit every skin type; in particular, those with oily skin should choose non-comedogenic sunscreens; those with dry skins should choose sunscreens with moisturizers to help keep skin hydrated, and those with sensitive skin should choose unscented, hypoallergenic sunscreen and spot-test in an inconspicuous place (such as the inside of the elbow or behind the ear) to ensure that it does not irritate the skin.

Elderly

Skin ageing is associated with increased vulnerability. As one ages, so does their skin. Fine lines, bruising, spots, dry skin, and more can slowly, overtime become more apparent. Although wrinkles occur naturally as we age, smoking can worsen the appearance of wrinkles. As humans spend time in the sun, we aren't aware of the long-term effects. As time progresses, sunspots, dryness, wrinkles, or even cancer can occur from sun exposure. This can also occur by tanning either with the sun or with the usage of UV lights. The exposure to UV makes skin less ecstatic. Skin problems including pruritus are common in the elderly but are often inadequately addressed. A literature review of studies that assessed maintenance of skin integrity in the elderly found most to be low levels of evidence, but the review concluded that skin-cleansing with synthetic detergents or amphoteric surfactants induced less skin dryness than using soap and water. Moisturizers with humectants helped with skin dryness, and skin barrier occlusive reduced skin injuries. When taking baths or showers, using warm water rather than hot can aid with dryness.

There is limited evidence that moisturizing soap bar; combinations of water soak, oil soak, and lotion are effective in maintaining the skin integrity of elderly people when compared to standard care.

Acne

According to the American Academy of Dermatology, between 40 and 50 million Americans develop acne each year. Although many associate acne with adolescence, acne can occur at any age, with its causes including heredity, hormones, menstruation, food, and emotional stress.

Those with inflammatory acne should exfoliate with caution as the procedure may make conditions worse and consult a dermatologist before treatment. Some anti-acne creams contain drying agents such as benzoyl peroxide (in concentrations of 2.5 - 10% ).

Pressure sore

Pressure sores are injuries to the skin and underlying tissue as a result of prolonged pressure on the skin. A known example of a pressure sore is a bedsore called a pressure ulcer.

Stoma

Add from 

When cleaning the stoma area, plain warm water should be use and dry wipe to gently clean around the stoma. Pat gently and make sure not to rub the area. Put all used wipes in a disposable bag and wash your hands after.

Wound healing

Wound healing is a complex and fragile process in which the skin repairs itself after injury. It is susceptible to interruption or failure that creates non-healing chronic wounds.

Radiation

Radiation induces skin reactions in the treated area, particularly in the axilla, head and neck, perineum and skin fold regions. Formulations with moisturising, anti-inflammatory, anti-microbial and wound healing properties are often used, but no preferred approach or individual product has been identified as best practice. Soft silicone dressings that act as barriers to friction may be helpful. In breast cancer, calendula cream may reduce the severity of radiation effects on the dark spot corrector. Deodorant use after completing radiation treatment has been controversial but is now recommended for practice. Add from

EGFR

Epidermal growth factor receptor (EGFR) inhibitors are medications used in cancer treatment. These medications commonly cause skin and nail problems, including rashes, dry skin and paronychia. Preventive intensive moisturizing with emollient ointments several times, avoidance of water-based creams and water soaks (although in certain circumstances white vinegar or potassium permanganate soaks may help), protection the skin from excessive exposure to sunshine, and soap substitutes which are less dehydrating for the skin than normal soaps, as well as shampoos that reduce the risk of scalp folliculitis, are recommended. Treatment measures with topical antibiotic medication can be helpful.

Related products

Cosmeceuticals are topically applied, combination products that bring together cosmetics and "biologically active ingredients". Products which are similar in perceived benefits but ingested orally are known as nutricosmetics. According to the United States Food and Drug Administration (FDA), the Food, Drug, and Cosmetic Act "does not recognize any such category as "cosmeceuticals." A product can be a drug, a cosmetic, or a combination of both, but the term "cosmeceutical" has no meaning under the law". Drugs are subject to an intensive review and approval process by FDA. Cosmetics, and these related products, although regulated, are not approved by FDA prior to sale.

Procedures

 
Skin care procedures include use of botulinum; exfoliation; fillers; laser medicine in cosmetic resurfacing, hair removal, vitiligo, port-wine stain and tattoo removal; photodynamic therapy; microdermabrasion; peels; retinol therapy.

References